Plesistovsky is a rural locality (a khutor) in Kachalinskoye Rural Settlement, Surovikinsky District, Volgograd Oblast, Russia. The population was 20 as of 2010.

Geography 
Plesistovsky is located 63 km northeast of Surovikino (the district's administrative centre) by road. Mayorovsky is the nearest rural locality.

References 

Rural localities in Surovikinsky District